The New Jersey Detective Agency, also known as the NJDA, is a body politic created by the New Jersey Legislature in 1871 conferring statewide police powers on its officers. The Agency functions as the administrative body of the New Jersey State Detectives.

References

External links 

State agencies of New Jersey
New Jersey Legislature
1871 establishments in New Jersey